Donald Roy Irvine (January 20, 1920 – October 1, 1994) was a Canadian politician, who served in the Legislative Assembly of Ontario from 1971 to 1977 as a Progressive Conservative member. He was a cabinet member for Premier Bill Davis.

Background
Irvine was born on a farm in eastern Ontario, the youngest of seven children. He worked on the farm during his youth, and after high school he served in the Royal Canadian Air Force during World War II. After the war, he and his brother-in-law started a grocery store which eventually turned into a chain of six grocery stores. He sold those grocery stores to the large food chain of Loeb, being able to retire in a very financially sound position at 36. He was married (Eleanor) and had one son (Paul) and one daughter (Jane).

Politics
Irvine served on the town council of Prescott, including three terms as mayor. Of his service, the Ottawa Citizen, on the eve of the provincial election in 1971, said, "Most townspeople consider Mr Irvine's three terms as one of the best things that ever happened to them."

Irvine was elected to the Legislative Assembly of Ontario in the 1971 provincial election in the riding of Grenville—Dundas replacing the retiring Fred Cass. Irvine became parliamentary assistant to Treasurer John White in 1972. In February 1974 he was appointed as Minister without portfolio responsible for Municipal Affairs. In October 1974 he was appointed as Minister of Housing replacing Sid Handleman who had suffered a heart attack. In 1975 he was shuffled to the Provincial Secretary for Resource Development. He continued to serve in cabinet until his retirement in 1977.

Cabinet posts

References

External links 
 

1920 births
1994 deaths
Progressive Conservative Party of Ontario MPPs
Members of the Executive Council of Ontario